Tunisian Americans are Americans of Tunisian descent. Tunisia–United States relations date back more than 200 years.

History 
Prior to the arrival of Peace Corps and Amideast volunteers in the early-1960s and 1970s, there was little interest on the part of Tunisians to emigrate to the US. Many Tunisians, including Jews, immigrated when Tunisia was under French rule. In 1981, the U.S. launched its Technology Transfer Program in Tunisia with the goal of increasing Tunisia's long-term capacity to apply new technologies in support of the development of a market economy. The Technology Transfer Program aimed to accomplish this by developing a substantial cadre of individuals with the skills and attitudes needed to develop and sustain a competitive, open market system. USAID/Tunis to date has obligated $45 million under the Project, has dispersed all but about $3 million of that total. Through the TTP, young and intelligent Tunisians were granted the opportunity to pursue studies in the United States. By the late-1990s, the number of Tunisians in United States started to grow, reaching around 8,000 through the launch of the Diversity Immigrant Visa program.

Building a Tunisian-American community 
In 1998, the idea of building a Tunisian-American community was born; an impossible task, considering the dispersion of the community (basically diluted between the West Coast, Northeast and Southeast areas) and the size of the country. At that time, the Internet and high-tech telecommunications started to grow and evolve.

So, the strategy was to build a virtual community that would, in time, be merged with the offline community. By late 1998, way before Facebook, MySpace and Twitter, http://www.tunisiancommunity.org/ became  "the Cultural Home" for Tunisians in America and the Tunisian Community Center, their institution. The modest website, with the help of several tech-savvy Tunisian volunteers over the years, became what is now a powerful, interactive Web presence. 
 
Over the years, in spite of always being seen thru a "political lens", thanks to steadfast  leadership and many dedicated volunteers, the organization was able to inspire the formation of local chapters that operate autonomously, but carry out the mission of the organization by conducting community-based activities that raise the profile of Tunisia in the United States and promote cross-cultural literacy.

Notable people 

 Bruce Allen (American football) (of Tunisian Jewish descent)
 George Allen (American politician) (of Tunisian Jewish descent)
 Jennifer Allen (of Tunisian Jewish descent)
 Max Azria (of Tunisian Jewish descent)
 Aziza Baccouche
 M. Salah Baouendi
 Leila Ben Youssef
 Mounir Laroussi
 Miled Faiza

Annissa Essaibi George
 Ben Guez
 Suleika Jaouad
 Colette Justine
 David Mazouz (of Tunisian Jewish descent)
 Anissa Naouai
 Ghaya Oliveira
 Nick Valensi (of Tunisian Jewish descent) 
 Noël Wells

See also 
Tunisia–United States relations
North Africans in the United States
Tunisian Canadians

References

External links
The Tunisian American Center

Arab American
North Africans in the United States